The men's madison competition at the 2019 European Games was held at the Minsk Velodrome on 29 June 2019.

Results
200 laps (50 km) were raced with 20 sprints.

References

Men's madison